The 1987–88 B Group was the thirty-second season of the Bulgarian B Football Group, the second tier of the Bulgarian football league system. A total of 20 teams contested the league.

Teams

Stadiums and locations

Personnel

League table

Top scorers

References

External links 
 1987–88 Bulgarian B Group season

1987-88
Bul
2